Nancy Grossman (born April 28, 1940) is an American artist. Grossman is best known for her wood and leather sculptures of heads.

Early life and education
Nancy Grossman was born in 1940 in New York City  to parents who worked in the garment industry. She moved at the age of five to Oneonta, New York. There, she began helping her parents at work making darts, which are three-dimensional folds sewn into fabric to give shape; and gussets, which are materials sewn into fabric to strengthen a garment. Her experience in sewing influenced her work as an artist. Grossman studied at Pratt Institute and earned a Bachelor of Fine Arts degree under the tutelage of Richard Lindner, in 1962. Grossman’s paintings, collages, and sculpture come out of a distinctly individual understanding of the psychological reality of contemporary life. She then traveled Europe after earning Pratt's Ida C. Haskell Award for Foreign Travel. and a John Simon Guggenheim Foundation Fellowship (1965–66). The accolades have continued throughout her career and include a National Endowment for the Arts Fellowship (1984), a New York Foundation for the Arts Fellowship (1991), a Joan Mitchell Foundation Grant (1996–97), and a Pollock-Krasner Foundation Grant (2001).

When she began making art her work was largely collage and drawings. She was working in the 1960s, when Abstract Expression was popular, and she was torn between abstract art and her love for material exploration. At 23, Grossman had her first solo exhibition at the Kasner gallery in New York City. Her artwork included collages, constructions, drawings, and paintings. In 1964 she moved to Eldridge Street in Chinatown and continued to work there. Her move afforded her more space, so she began assembling free standingpieces and wall assemblages of at least six feet by four feet.

In 1972, Grossman signed the "We Have Had Abortions" campaign by Ms. magazine which called for an end to "archaic laws" limiting reproductive freedom, they encouraged women to share their stories and take action.

Her image is included in the iconic 1972 poster Some Living American Women Artists by Mary Beth Edelson.

Grossman relocated to Brooklyn in 1999 after being forced to leave her Chinatown studio which she had occupied for thirty-five years. Her work also struck out in new directions with a group of sculptural assemblages that seem to echo the archaeology and violence involved in the upheaval of her move.

Art

Grossman is probably most well known for her work with figures sculpted from soft wood and then covered in leather. Grossman first used wood, generally soft and "found," such as old telephone poles, and carefully sculpts heads and bodies. The very first head that she created incorporated the use of black leather, epoxy, thread, wood, and metal. The original head quickly evolved into an ongoing series of roughly 100 heads, which is still being created in her Brooklyn studio to this day. The heads she sculpted early in her career were "blind" as the eyes were covered by leather; however, openings were always left for the noses. Grossman explains that she wanted to release some of the tension and let the figure breathe. Her attention to detail is seen in her workmanship, with each stitch of leather sewn carefully. The sculpture Male Figure (1971), is one of her full-bodied forms. Grossman uses leather, straps, zippers, and string to create sculptures that appear bound and restrained. She describes her work as autobiographical, and despite figures like Male Figure, which has male genitalia, she says her sculptures are self-portraits.<ref>Swartz, Anne. "The Erotics of Envelopment Figuration in Nancy Grossman's Art," N. Paradoxa: 2007. Accessed 3/9/13. https://www.academia.edu/244278 Anne_Swartz_The_Erotics_of_Envelopment_Figuration_in_Nancy_Grossmans_Art and Getsy, David "Second Skins: The Unbound Genders of Nancy Grossman's Sculpture," Abstract Bodies: Sixties Sculpture in the Expanded Field of Gender (New Haven and London: Yale University Press, 2015), 147-207.</ref>

Others have reviewed her work as seemingly sexual and reminiscent of sadism and masochism, which Grossman denies. She says her work challenges the ideas of gender identity and gender fluidity. Grossman says the sculptures refer to her "bondage in childhood," but others have said that her work may flirt with the potential of female artists who had not yet gained prominence in the 1960s. Head from 1968, in the collection of the Honolulu Museum of Art, is typical of the wood and leather sculptures of heads for which the artist is best known.

Recent work
Some of her later work, such as Black Lava Scape from her series Combustion Scapes (1994–95) are mixed media collages created from found objects. Another piece in the series Self-Contained Lavascape (1991) is a mixed media collage drawing. According to a review in the New York Times, these pieces were inspired by a helicopter flight over an active volcano in Hawaii.

In 1995, Grossman sustained an injury to her hand which made working with sculpture very difficult. After an operation to rebuild part of her hand, she was left with limited mobility, which is what led her to go back to her work with collage and painting.

Recently, her work has been shown in major museum exhibitions. In the summer of 2011, PS1-MoMA presented a solo exhibition of her sculptural heads, and in 2012, the Tang Museum at Skidmore College presented Nancy Grossman: Tough Life, a five-decade survey. Throughout her impressive career, Grossman has received a steady flow of accolades, including a National Endowment for the Arts Fellowship (1984), a New York Foundation for the Arts Fellowship (1991), a Joan Mitchell Foundation Grant (1996–97), and a Pollock-Krasner Foundation Grant (2001), and her work is represented in the permanent collections of museums worldwide.

Censorship
In 2009, the U.S. Postal Service censored her postcard, for her etchings of a book by Adrienne Rich.

Exhibitions
1990 "Nancy Grossman: A Retrospective", Hillwood Art Museum, Brookville, NY
1995  "Nancy Grossman: Opus Volcanus", Hooks-Epstein Galleries
2000  "Nancy Grossman: Fire Fields", The Contemporary Museum at First Hawaiian Center
2001 "Nancy Grossman: Loud Whispers, Four Decades of Assemblage, Collages and Sculpture", Michael Rosenfeld Gallery, New York 
2007  "Nancy Grossman: Drawings", Michael Rosenfeld Gallery, New York, NY
2011  "Nancy Grossman: Combustion Scapes", Michael Rosenfeld Gallery 
2011  "Nancy Grossman: Heads", MoMA PS-1, New York City
2012  "Nancy Grossman", Frances Young Tang Museum
February 28, 2014 – August 16, 2014 "Modern American Realism: The Sara Roby Foundation Collection"https://americanart.si.edu/exhibitions/roby

 Awards 
1962: Ida C. Haskell Award for Foreign Travel, Pratt Institute
1965-66: John Simon Guggenheim Foundation Fellowship
1966: Inaugural Contemporary Achievement Award, Pratt Institute, Brooklyn, NY
1970: One Hundred Women In Touch With Our Time, Harper’s Bazaar Magazine
1973: Juror, New York State Council on the Arts, sculpture applicants for CAPS Fellowships
1974: Commencement Speaker and Honored Guest, 99th Commencement Exercises, Massachusetts College of Art, Boston, MA
1974: American Academy of Arts and Letters, National Institute of Arts and Letters Award
1974: Juror, American Academy in Rome, sculpture applicants for Prix de Rome Fellowships
1975: Elected to Membership, National Society of Literature and the Arts
1984: National Endowment for the Arts Fellowship in Sculpture
1990: The Hassam, Speicher, Betts and Symons Purchase Award, The American Academy and Institute of Arts and Letters
1991: Artist’s Fellowship in Sculpture, The New York Foundation for the Arts
1991-92: Nancy Grossman at Exit Art, The Hillwood Art Museum and the Sculpture Center selected one of the three best exhibitions in an art gallery of this season by The American Chapter of the International Art Critics Association
1992: Elected into the National Academy of Design as an Associate member (became a full Academician in 1994).
1995: Alumnae Achievement Award, Pratt Institute, Brooklyn, NY
1996-97 Joan Mitchell Foundation Grant
2001: Pollock-Krasner Foundation Grant
2008: Women's Caucus for Art Lifetime Achievement Award.

BibliographyNancy Grossman: loud whispers: four decades of assemblage, collage and sculpture, Michael Rosenfeld Gallery, 2000,  

 Ian Berry, ed., Nancy Grossman: Tough Life Diary [retrospective] (Saratoga Springs, New York: Tang Teaching Museum at Skidmore College with Prestel USA, 2013).
 David J. Getsy, "Second Skins: The Unbound Genders of Nancy Grossman's Sculpture," in Abstract Bodies: Sixties Sculpture in the Expanded Field of Gender'' (New Haven and London: Yale University Press, 2015), 147–207.

References

External links
Works by Nancy Grossman at Smithsonian Archives of American Art
Nancy Grossman (Clara database, National Museum of Women in the Arts)

1940 births
Pratt Institute alumni
American women sculptors
Living people
Artists from New York City
20th-century American women artists
20th-century American sculptors
21st-century American women artists
21st-century American sculptors
People from Oneonta, New York
Sculptors from New York (state)
People from Chinatown, Manhattan
People from Brooklyn